Baker Reagan Mayfield (born April 14, 1995) is an American football quarterback for the Tampa Bay Buccaneers of the National Football League (NFL). Following a stint with Texas Tech, Mayfield played college football at Oklahoma, where he won the Heisman Trophy as a senior. He was selected first overall by the Cleveland Browns in the 2018 NFL Draft. 

Mayfield set the rookie quarterback record for passing touchdowns, along with ending a 19-game winless streak for the Browns in his debut. His most successful season was in 2020 when he led the Browns to their first playoff appearance since 2002 and victory since 1994. However, due to inconsistent play and conflict with Browns management, Mayfield was traded to the Carolina Panthers in 2022. Following further inconsistent play and injuries, he was released by the Panthers near the end of the season and was claimed off waivers by the Rams.

Early life and high school career
Mayfield was born on April 14, 1995, in Austin, Texas, to James and Gina Mayfield as the second of two sons. James, a private equity consultant, encountered financial difficulties during his younger son's senior year in high school. These struggles forced the Mayfields to sell their family home and move from rental home to rental home.

Mayfield grew up as a fan of Oklahoma, and he attended a number of their games during his childhood. His father played football for three years for the University of Houston, though he never lettered.

Mayfield was the starting quarterback for the Lake Travis High School Cavaliers football team in Austin. He led Lake Travis to a 25–2 record in two seasons and won the 2011 4A State Championship. He finished his high school football career totaling 6,255 passing yards, 67 touchdowns, and eight interceptions. A 3-star recruit, Mayfield received light recruitment and only earned scholarship offers from Florida Atlantic, New Mexico, North Texas, Rice, Sam Houston State, and Wyoming, but also received preferred walk-on offers from Baylor, Texas Tech, and Washington State.

College career

Texas Tech
Shortly before the start of the 2013 season, Mayfield was named as the starting quarterback following a back injury of projected starter and former Lake Travis quarterback Michael Brewer. Mayfield is the first walk-on true freshman quarterback to start an FBS season opener at the quarterback position.

In his first start against SMU, Mayfield passed for 413 yards and four touchdowns. His 43 completions of 60 attempts broke a school record held by Billy Joe Tolliver, and fell only four completions short of the NCAA Division I FBS single-game record for completions by a freshman, held by Luke McCown. For his performance, Mayfield was named Big 12 Conference Offensive Player of the Week – the first freshman Texas Tech quarterback to be named so since former Red Raider head coach Kliff Kingsbury in 1999. The game featured the last four former Lake Travis quarterbacks combined on both teams: Garrett Gilbert, Michael Brewer, Collin Lagasse, and Mayfield.

Following the Red Raiders' second victory over Stephen F. Austin, Mayfield's 780 season yards and seven touchdowns already exceeded the 755 yards and six touchdowns accrued by Texas Tech's last true freshman quarterback, Aaron Keesee, in 10 games. After being affected by a knee injury and losing the starting job to fellow true freshman Davis Webb, Mayfield finished the season with 2,315 yards on 218-of-340 completions with 12 touchdowns and 9 interceptions.

Mayfield was named one of 10 semifinalists for the Burlsworth Trophy in November; the award is given to the best player in Division I football who began his college career as a walk-on.

Mayfield earned Big 12 Conference Freshman Offensive Player of the Year for the 2013 season. Mayfield announced that he would be leaving the program due to a "miscommunication" with the coaching staff.

Oklahoma
After playing for Texas Tech, Mayfield transferred to the University of Oklahoma in January 2014, but had not contacted the Sooners coaching staff. Mayfield further elaborated in an interview with ESPN that he sought to transfer due to scholarship issues and a perception that he had earned the starting position and that further competition was not "really fair." The alleged scholarship issues were denied by Texas Tech coach Kliff Kingsbury.

In February 2014, Oklahoma head coach Bob Stoops confirmed that Mayfield would be walking on for the Oklahoma Sooners. Mayfield was not eligible to play until the 2015 season, and he lost a season of eligibility due to Big 12 Conference transfer rules following an unsuccessful appeal of his transfer restrictions.

2015 season
On August 24, 2015, Mayfield was named the starting quarterback for the Sooners after winning an open quarterback competition against Trevor Knight. On September 6, 2015, Mayfield started against Akron. Mayfield totaled 388 passing yards with three passing touchdowns on 23 completions in the 41–3 win. In the second game of the 2015 season, Mayfield started at Tennessee at Neyland Stadium. The Sooners were ranked 19th at the time and the Volunteers were ranked 23rd. Mayfield started off very slow in the game, not even reaching midfield until the 13-minute mark of the fourth quarter. Oklahoma came back from a 17-point deficit to win the game by a score of 31–24 in double overtime. Mayfield threw for 187 yards and three touchdowns on 19 completions while throwing two interceptions early in the game. In the third game of the season, Mayfield started against Tulsa. He had a career day, throwing for 487 yards and four touchdowns, including 316 yards in the first half. Mayfield also ran for 85 yards and two touchdowns in the 52–38 win.

Mayfield finished the year with 3,700 passing yards, 36 touchdowns, and seven interceptions, a résumé which propelled him to fourth place in voting for the Heisman Trophy. Mayfield helped lead Oklahoma to the 2015 Orange Bowl, which served as the semifinal for the 2015 College Football Playoff. However, Oklahoma lost to Clemson by a score of 37–17.

2016 season
Mayfield started off the 2016 season with 323 passing yards and two touchdowns in a 33–23 loss to #15 Houston. In the rivalry game against Texas on October 8, he had 390 passing yards, three touchdowns, and two interceptions in the 45–40 victory. On October 22, in a 66–59 victory over Texas Tech, Mayfield had 545 passing yards and seven touchdowns in a historic matchup against future NFL quarterback Patrick Mahomes. Mahomes tallied 734 passing yards and five touchdowns to go along with Mayfield's numbers in a game that broke various single-game passing records. Over the final five games of the regular season, Mayfield totaled 1,321 passing yards, 15 passing touchdowns, and three interceptions, to go along with three rushing touchdowns. All five games were victories for the Sooners.

In December 2016, it was announced that Mayfield and his top receiving target, Dede Westbrook, would be finalists for the 2016 Heisman Trophy. It was also announced that they would play in the 2017 Sugar Bowl. Mayfield ended up finishing third in the Heisman voting.

In the 2017 Sugar Bowl, Mayfield helped lead the Sooners to a 35–19 victory over Auburn. He finished the game with 19 completions on 28 attempts for 296 passing yards and two touchdowns, earning him the MVP award.

2017 season
On September 9, 2017, after a win against the Ohio State Buckeyes in Columbus, Mayfield planted the Sooners' flag in the middle of the painted "O" at Ohio Stadium, causing a major public backlash. Mayfield issued an apology shortly afterwards.

On November 4, 2017, Mayfield threw for a school-high 598 yards against in-state rival Oklahoma State. Mayfield finished 24-for-36 with five passing touchdowns and one rushing touchdown, and Oklahoma won the game by a score of 62–52. Mayfield completed his career 3–0 as the starting Oklahoma quarterback in the Bedlam Series.

In November 2017, Mayfield was under fire again after an interaction during the game against Kansas. Mayfield was seen grabbing his crotch and mouthing "Fuck you!" at the coach of the opposing team. He also told their fans to "Go cheer on basketball." In response, Mayfield issued another public apology. Days after the 41–3 victory over Kansas, Sooners head coach Lincoln Riley announced that Mayfield would not start or be the captain during the upcoming game against West Virginia due to his actions against Kansas.

On December 2, 2017, with the return of the Big 12 Championship Game after a six-year hiatus, Mayfield led Oklahoma to its third straight Big 12 championship, with Oklahoma beating the TCU Horned Frogs 41–17. Mayfield won MVP honors while Oklahoma clinched a second playoff berth in three years. A month later, the Sooners lost to the Georgia Bulldogs 54–48 in the 2018 Rose Bowl, which served as the national semifinal game.

On December 9, 2017, Mayfield won the 2017 Heisman Trophy with a sweeping majority. He received 732 first-place votes and a total of 2,398 points. This amount translated to 86% of the possible points and the third highest percentage in Heisman history. In addition, Mayfield became the first and only walk-on player to ever win the Heisman Trophy.

"Baker Mayfield rule"
When Mayfield transferred from Texas Tech to Oklahoma after his freshman year, he filed an appeal to the NCAA to allow him to be eligible to play immediately at Oklahoma on the basis that he was a walk-on and not a scholarship player at Texas Tech; therefore, the transfer rules that apply to scholarship players should not be applicable to his situation. The NCAA denied his appeal as he did not meet the criteria. Big 12 Conference rules additionally stipulate that intra-conference transfers will lose one year of eligibility over and beyond the one-year sit-out imposed by the NCAA. Mayfield attempted to appeal his initial loss of eligibility to the Big 12 Conference faculty athletics representatives but was denied in September 2014.

Officials from Oklahoma asked Texas Tech officials to authorize Mayfield's immediate eligibility, but Texas Tech officials objected and declined the request before granting a release in July 2014. Mayfield was thus forced to sit out the 2014 season, while also losing one year of eligibility as required by the rules.

On June 1, 2016, the Big 12 faculty athletic representatives voted against a rule proposal that would have allowed walk-on players to transfer within the conference and not lose a year of eligibility. The next day, the rule proposal was amended to allow walk-on players, without a written scholarship offer from the school they are transferring from, to transfer within the conference without losing a season of eligibility. The faculty athletic representatives approved the amended proposal with a vote of 7–3. The rule change made Mayfield eligible to play for Oklahoma through the 2017 season. Texas Tech voted in favor of the rule.

College statistics

Professional career

Cleveland Browns
The Cleveland Browns selected Mayfield with the first overall pick in the 2018 NFL Draft. Mayfield signed a four-year rookie contract with the Browns on July 24, 2018, with the deal worth $32.68 million in guaranteed salary.

2018 season

Mayfield played in his first NFL game in Week 3 against the New York Jets, replacing an injured Tyrod Taylor with the Browns down 14–0. Mayfield went 17 of 23, passing for 201 yards as the Browns came back and prevailed 21–17, ending their winless streak at 19 games. Mayfield became the first player since Fran Tarkenton in 1961 to come off the bench in his debut, throw for more than 200 yards, and lead his team to its first win of the season.

Mayfield started for the first time in the Browns' next game, making him the 30th starting quarterback for the Browns since their return to the NFL in 1999, in a 45–42 overtime loss to the Oakland Raiders. In Week 5, Mayfield threw for 342 passing yards and one touchdown as he earned his first victory as a Browns' starter, in a 12–9 overtime win over the Baltimore Ravens. In Week 10, Mayfield led the Browns to a 28–16 victory over the Atlanta Falcons. throwing for 216 yards, three touchdowns, and a passer rating of 151.2, with no turnovers. The following week, Mayfield led the Browns to their first away win since 2015, against the Cincinnati Bengals. He completed 19 of 26 passes for 258 yards and four touchdowns. In Week 12, in a 29–13 loss to the Houston Texans, Mayfield passed for 397 yards, one touchdown, and three interceptions. Mayfield bounced back in the following game, a 26–20 victory over the Carolina Panthers, going 18 of 22 for 238 passing yards and one touchdown.

In Week 16, Mayfield completed 27 of 37 passes for 284 yards and three touchdowns with no interceptions in a 26–18 win over the Cincinnati Bengals, earning him AFC Offensive Player of the Week. He also won the Pepsi NFL Rookie of the Week fan vote for the sixth time. On December 29, Mayfield was fined $10,026 for unsportsmanlike conduct during the game. As reported by The Plain Dealer, Mayfield "pretended to expose his private parts" to Browns offensive coordinator Freddie Kitchens after throwing a touchdown to tight end Darren Fells. Kitchens later defended the gesture as an inside joke between the two. Mayfield's agent Tom Mills said they would appeal the fine. On December 30, in the regular-season finale against the Ravens' league-best defense and fellow rookie quarterback Lamar Jackson, Mayfield threw for 376 yards and three touchdowns, but his three costly interceptions— one of which came at the hands of linebacker C. J. Mosley with 1:02 left in the fourth quarter while attempting to drive the team into range of a game-winning field goal attempt— ultimately contributed to a 26–24 loss.

Nonetheless, Mayfield helped lead the Browns to a 7-8-1 record and their best record since 2007. He finished the season with 3,725 passing yards and also surpassed Peyton Manning and Russell Wilson for most touchdowns thrown in a rookie season with 27.

While Mayfield was considered by many to be the favorite for Offensive Rookie of the Year for 2018, the award was given to Giants running back Saquon Barkley.  On the annual Top 100 Players list for 2019, Mayfield's peers named him the 50th best player in the league, one spot behind teammate Myles Garrett. He was named 2018 PFWA All-Rookie, the second Cleveland quarterback to receive this honor since Tim Couch in 1999.

2019 season

In Week 1 against the Tennessee Titans, Mayfield threw for 285 yards and a touchdown.  However, he also threw three fourth-quarter interceptions, one of which was returned by Malcolm Butler for a touchdown. The Browns lost 43–13. After the blowout loss, Mayfield said "I just think everybody just needs to be more disciplined. I think everybody knows what the problem is. We'll see if it's just bad technique or just see what it is. Dumb penalties hurting ourself and then penalties on my part. Just dumb stuff." In Week 2 against the New York Jets, Mayfield finished with 325 passing yards, including a quick-attack pass to Beckham that went 89 yards for a touchdown as the Browns won 23–3. In Week 4 against the Baltimore Ravens, Mayfield threw for 342 yards, one touchdown, and one interception in the 40–25 win. Against the San Francisco 49ers, Mayfield struggled against a stout 49ers defense, completing just 8-of-22 passes for 100 yards with two interceptions as the Browns were routed 31–3.

Mayfield recorded his first game of the season with two or more passing touchdowns in Week 10 against the Buffalo Bills, completing 26 of 38 passes for 238 yards and two touchdowns, including the game-winner to Rashard Higgins, as the Browns snapped a four-game losing streak with a 19–16 win. Four days later against the Pittsburgh Steelers and former Big 12 Conference rival Mason Rudolph, Mayfield recorded his first career win against Pittsburgh, accounting for three total touchdowns (2 passing, 1 rushing) as Cleveland won 21–7. In Week 12 against the Miami Dolphins, Mayfield threw for 327 yards, three touchdowns, and one interception in the 41–24 win. In Week 17 against the Cincinnati Bengals, Mayfield became the first Cleveland Browns QB to start all 16 games in a season since Tim Couch in 2001. In the game, Mayfield threw for 279 yards, three touchdowns, and three interceptions as the Browns lost 33–23. Mayfield finished the 2019 season with 3,827 passing yards, 22 touchdowns, and 21 interceptions as the Browns finished with a 6–10 record.

2020 season

In Week 1 against the Baltimore Ravens, Mayfield threw for 189 passing yards, a touchdown and an interception in the 38–6 loss. In the following week against the Cincinnati Bengals, Mayfield finished with 218 passing yards, two touchdowns and an interception in the 35–30 win. In Week 6 against the Pittsburgh Steelers, Mayfield completed 10 of 18 passes for 119 yards, with one touchdown, two interceptions and took four sacks during the 38–7 loss. Mayfield was replaced by Case Keenum in the third quarter due to aggravation of a minor rib injury he suffered in the previous week's game. In Week 7 against the Cincinnati Bengals, Mayfield started off slow completing 0 of 5 passes with an interception, but later completed 22 of 23 passes for 297 yards and a career-high five touchdowns including one to Donovan Peoples-Jones with 11 seconds remaining in the fourth quarter to help secure a 37–34 Browns' win. Mayfield was named AFC Offensive Player of the Week for his performance in Week 7.

Mayfield was placed on the reserve/COVID-19 list on November 8 after being in close contact with a person who tested positive for the virus, and was activated three days later. In Week 13 against the Tennessee Titans, Mayfield completed 25 of 33 passes for 334 yards and four touchdowns which were all in the first half in a 41–35 victory.  Mayfield tied Otto Graham for four first half touchdowns and the victory marked the Browns first winning record since 2007. Hence, Mayfield was named the FedEx Air player of the week for week 13. In Week 14 against the Ravens, Mayfield threw for 343 yards, 2 touchdowns, and 1 interception as well as rushing for 23 yards and a touchdown during the 47–42 loss. In Week 16 against the New York Jets, Mayfield lost a fumble on fourth down with 1:25 remaining in the game while attempting a quarterback sneak during the 23–16 loss. In Week 17, Mayfield and the Browns defeated the Pittsburgh Steelers 24–22 and earned their first post season playoff berth since 2002.  The Browns finished the regular season 11–5.

In the Wild Card Round against the Pittsburgh Steelers, Mayfield went 21 of 34 for 263 yards and 3 touchdowns during the 48–37 win, leading the Browns to their first playoff victory since the 1994 season, and the Browns’ first playoff road victory since the 1969 season. In the Divisional Round of the playoffs against the Kansas City Chiefs, Mayfield threw for 204 yards, 1 touchdown, and 1 interception during the 22–17 loss.

Overall, Mayfield finished the 2020 season with 4,030 passing yards, 30 touchdowns, and nine interceptions through 18 total games. He was ranked 71st by his fellow players on the NFL Top 100 Players of 2021.

2021 season

The Browns exercised Mayfield's fifth-year contract option for the 2022 season on April 23, 2021, worth $18.9 million guaranteed. On October 7, 2021, it was revealed that Mayfield was playing with a partially torn labrum which he suffered during the Browns Week 2 victory over the Houston Texans. Mayfield continued to play with the injury until reaggravating it in Week 6 against the Arizona Cardinals. Due to the injury, Mayfield was ruled out for the Browns' Week 7 game against the Denver Broncos, missing his first game since taking over as the Browns' starter in 2018. On November 14, 2021, Mayfield suffered a right knee contusion during their crushing Week 10 loss to the Patriots. While the injury was not severe, coach Kevin Stefanski decided not to put him in for the rest of the game due to Mayfield absorbing hits and the game being out of reach. After the Browns were eliminated from the postseason following a Week 17 loss to the Pittsburgh Steelers, the Browns announced Mayfield would undergo surgery on the torn labrum, ending Mayfield's season. He was placed on injured reserve on January 5, 2022. Mayfield threw for 3,010 yards, 17 touchdowns, and 13 interceptions in 14 games played.

In the 2022 offseason, after the Browns traded for quarterback Deshaun Watson and signed him to a contract extension, Mayfield requested that the team trade him.

Carolina Panthers

On July 6, 2022, Mayfield was traded to the Carolina Panthers for a 2024 conditional fifth-round draft pick.

Mayfield competed against Sam Darnold for the starting position with the team. On August 22, 2022, Mayfield was named the Week 1 starter for the Panthers for their game against the Cleveland Browns. Against the Browns, Mayfield threw for 235 yards, a touchdown, and an interception in the 26–24 loss despite a late rally. Mayfield suffered a high-ankle sprain in the Panthers Week 5 loss to the San Francisco 49ers, which made him miss the next week against the Los Angeles Rams. Mayfield returned and backed up P. J. Walker for Weeks 8 and 9. After the Panthers were blown out by the  Cincinnati Bengals 35–0, Mayfield started the second half where he threw for 155 yards and two touchdowns in the 42–21 loss.

Mayfield requested and was granted his release by the Panthers on December 5, 2022.

Los Angeles Rams

On December 6, 2022, Mayfield was claimed off waivers by the Los Angeles Rams, who inherited the remaining $1.35 million on his contract. Two days after being claimed off waivers, Mayfield played against the Las Vegas Raiders. In the game, he led the Rams to a game-winning 98-yard drive with no timeouts and 1:45 remaining in the game, which became the longest touchdown drive of his career. Mayfield was named the NFL Offensive player of the week following his 98-yard game-winning drive.

In a Week 15 Monday Night Football matchup against the Green Bay Packers, Mayfield threw his 100th career passing touchdown. In a Week 16 matchup against the Denver Broncos, Mayfield led the Rams to a dominant 51–14 win while completing 24 of 28 pass attempts for 230 yards and throwing for two touchdowns.

Tampa Bay Buccaneers
On March 16, 2023, Mayfield signed a one-year contract with the Tampa Bay Buccaneers.

NFL career statistics

Regular season

Postseason

Career accomplishments

NCAA

Accolades
 Heisman Trophy (2017)
 2x Heisman Trophy Finalist (2016, 2017)
 Maxwell Award (2017)
 Walter Camp Award (2017)
 Davey O'Brien Award (2017)
 Associated Press Player of the Year (2017)
 2× Sporting News Player of the Year (2015, 2017)
 2× Burlsworth Trophy (2015, 2016)
 2× Big 12 Offensive Player of the Year (2015, 2017)
 Big 12 Offensive Freshman of the Year (2013)
 2× First-team All-American (2015, 2017)
 3× First-team All-Big 12 (2015–2017)
 First former walk-on to win Heisman Trophy
 NCAA passer rating leader (2017) [203.8]

NFL

Accolades
 7× Pepsi NFL Rookie of the Week (2018 Weeks 3, 7, 9, 12, 14, 16, 17)
 2x AFC Offensive Player of the Week: Week 16 (2018), Week 7 (2020)
 PFT Rookie of the Year (2018)
 PFWA Rookie of the Year (2018)
 PFF Offensive Rookie of the Year (2018)
 PFWA All-Rookie Team (2018)

Personal life
On February 25, 2017, Mayfield was arrested in Washington County, Arkansas on charges of public intoxication, disorderly conduct, and fleeing and resisting arrest. At 2:29 a.m. that Saturday, a police officer was flagged down on an assault and battery report. The person who flagged the officer was yelling at Mayfield. The preliminary police report described Mayfield as unable to walk straight, having slurred speech and food covering the front of his shirt. When he was asked to stay so the police could get a statement, Mayfield began shouting obscenities and "causing a scene". Mayfield was booked at 8:21 a.m. local time on the misdemeanor charges. He had a court date on April 7 for the public intoxication charge, he pleaded not guilty to all charges. On June 15, 2017, the University of Oklahoma ordered Mayfield to undergo 35 hours of community service along with completing an alcohol education program.

In July 2019, Mayfield married Emily Wilkinson.

References

External links

 
 Los Angeles Rams profile
 Oklahoma Sooners profile
 
 

1995 births
Living people
All-American college football players
American football quarterbacks
Cleveland Browns players
Heisman Trophy winners
Maxwell Award winners
National Football League first-overall draft picks
Oklahoma Sooners football players
Players of American football from Austin, Texas
Tampa Bay Buccaneers players
Texas Tech Red Raiders football players
Carolina Panthers players
Los Angeles Rams players